VD-dev (formerly Velez & Dubail Dev. Team) is a French video game development studio founded in 1990. The studio worked on several Game Boy and Game Boy Advance games for Infogrames and Atari.

History 
The studio was founded by the programmer Fernando Velez and the graphic designer Guillaume Dubail, with both working on game design.  After abandoning a shoot 'em up concept in 1989, they developed  Jim Power in Mutant Planet under the name Digital Concept. They parted ways between 1992 and 1996 (Guillaume Dubail worked on Jim Power's graphics while Fernando Velez programmed Mr. Nutz and Jurassic Park Part 2: The Chaos Continues for Game Boy). They were credited under their names beginning in 1996, then as Velez & Dubail Dev. Team from 2002 (V-Rally 3) and eventually as VD-dev from 2007. In 2013, they were reunited by Frédéric Zimmer, animation programmer for  Ubisoft's Watch Dogs. Fernando Velez died in July 2016; he was 46 years old.

Games developed

References

External links 
 Official Site

Video game development companies
Video game companies of France
Video game companies established in 1990
French companies established in 1990